The 1973 Big League World Series took place from August 14–18 in Fort Lauderdale, Florida, United States. Lincolnwood, Illinois defeated Orange County, California twice in the championship game.

Teams

Results

References

Big League World Series
Big League World Series